The following is a list of all team-to-team transactions that have occurred in the National Hockey League (NHL) during the 1955–56 NHL season. It lists which team each player has been traded to and for which player(s) or other consideration(s), if applicable.

Transactions 

Notes
 Transaction voided when Quackenbush retired on July 15, 1955.
 Rights claimed by both Montreal and Toronto out of junior.  Rights traded to Chicago by Buffalo (AHL) for $15,000 with Montreal receiving Bob Duncan and Toronto receiving Gary Collins.
 Transaction voided when Blaisdell was not able to report to Detroit (date unknown).

References

Transactions
National Hockey League transactions